The Trofeo Cidade de Vigo was an annual pre-season football tournament, established in 1971 and hosted by the Vigo City Council. Celta Vigo is the most successful team with 21 titles.

Tournaments

Performance by team

References

External links
Trofeo Cidade de Vigo at RSSSF

RC Celta de Vigo
Spanish football friendly trophies
1971 establishments in Spain